Benneviaspidida is an order of osteostracan jawless fishes which lived in the Early Devonian. The fishes in this order have a flat headshield and are dorsoventrally depressed. The first canal to lateral sensory field bifurcates near the orbit.

Phylogeny
The cladogram below is adapted from Sansom (2009):

References

External links 
 Benneviaspidida at Palaeos
 Osteostraci by Philippe Janvier
 Osteostraci at Mikko's Phylogeny Archive
 Early Devonian osteostracans from Russia

Osteostraci
Prehistoric jawless fish orders
Devonian jawless fish
Early Devonian first appearances
Early Devonian taxonomic orders
Early Devonian extinctions